The Philippine Youth Games – Batang Pinoy or simply Batang Pinoy is the national youth sports competition of the Philippines for athletes under 15 years old. Unlike the Palarong Pambansa a competition for student athletes, the Batang Pinoy also includes the out-of-school youth.

History
The Batang Pinoy was established through the Executive Order No. 44 which was signed by then President Joseph Estrada on December 2, 1998. The first edition was held in Bacolod in 1999. From then, the games were held annually with Santa Cruz, Laguna (2000), Bacolod (2001) Puerto Princesa (2002) hosting the next three editions. The 2002 and prior editions, were for athletes of 12 years and below.

In 2003, the Philippine Sports Commission decided to put the competition, along with its other national competitions, on hold so the sports body could reallocate funds to the national teams' stint at the Southeast Asian Games. The Batang Pinoy was held again in 2011, and is held annually since then.

In 2017, the prospects of ending the organization of Batang Pinoy was raised due to it being redundant to the Palarong Pambansa, another national games but for student-athletes below 18 years of age.

In 2020, Batang Pinoy was cancelled due to the COVID-19 pandemic in the Philippines. Last held in 2019 in Puerto Princesa, Palawan, the Batang Pinoy would be not held until 2022 in Vigan, Ilocos Sur.

Editions
Host of the Batang Pinoy National Championships.

(*) Hosting of the originally 2013 edition postponed to early 2014. A second Batang Pinoy was hosted in the same year.

References

Batang Pinoy
Recurring sporting events established in 1998
Multi-sport events in the Philippines
1998 establishments in the Philippines
Youth multi-sport events
Youth sport in the Philippines